McCreadie is a Scottish surname; along with MacCready and McCredie it is a variant of the Irish McCready.  It is uncommon as a given name.  People with the surname include:

 Andrew McCreadie (1870–), Scottish footballer
 Drew McCreadie (born 1967), Canadian actor, playwright and improviser
 Eddie McCreadie (born 1940), Scottish footballer and manager
 Harvey McCreadie (1942–2008), Scottish footballer
 Michael McCreadie (born 1946), Scottish Paralympic athlete
 Tim McCreadie (born 1974), American Dirt Modified racing driver

References